Surfers Paradise Apollo Soccer Club is a semi-professional soccer club based in Surfers Paradise, Queensland, Australia. The club plays in the Football Queensland Premier League 2, the third flight of men's soccer in Queensland and the fourth flight of Australian soccer. Since the club was formed in 1978, Surfers Paradise Apollo have won 3 premierships, 3 championships and one president's cup within the top-flight Gold Coast regional competition, as well as a variety of second tier honours.

History
Greek-Australian Bert Voutos founded the Apollo Soccer Club in 1978 after failed attempts to convince the Gold Coast Greek Committee to buy/lease grounds and form a soccer club. The team was initially based at Sir Bruce Small Park in Benowa and shared tenancy with the Surfers Paradise Demons Australian rules football club. The Apollo club relocated to the TAFE Ashmore campus before eventually settling on the Isle of Capri and established facilities at Lex Bell Oval. The club was then renamed the Surfers Paradise Apollo Soccer Club as their new facilities were based in the suburb of Surfers Paradise.

The club won their first honours after winning the Gold Coast Premier League president's cup in 2000. This title was then followed up with a premiership and championship in 2002. 

In 2016, Surfers Paradise Apollo qualified the FFA Cup for the first time. They defeated Gold Coast Knights, Magic United, Gold Coast City, South West Queensland Thunder and Sunshine Coast to reach the round of 32, where they were defeated by Canberra Olympic 1−0 away at the Deakin Stadium in Canberra.

Following restructuring within Football Queensland competitions, the regional pyramids would be connected directly together to form a variety of streamline state conferences beginning in the 2022 season. As the 2021 Gold Coast Premier League premiers, the club defeated Sunshine Coast premiers Nambour Yandina United 4−1 and Brisbane Premier League premiers Bayside United 8−2 in the Football Queensland Premier League 2 play-offs to earn promotion into the competition.

Recent Seasons

The tiers in the above table is the level according to the Football Queensland South Coast zone system, Sources:

Honours

Football Queensland 

 Football Queensland Premier League 2 (third tier)
 Premiership
 Winners (1) (joint-record): 2022

Football Queensland South Coast 

 FQPL 3 − South Coast / Gold Coast Premier League (first tier)
 Premiership
 Winners (3): 2002, 2020, 2021
 Championship
 Winners (3): 2002, 2016, 2020
President's Cup
Winners (1): 2000

 FQPL 4 − South Coast / Men's Coast League 1 / Division 1 (second tier)
 Premiership
 Winners (1): 2013
Championship
Winners (1): 2013

Notes

References

External links

Association football clubs established in 1978
1978 establishments in Australia
Surfers Paradise, Queensland
Greek-Australian culture
Diaspora sports clubs in Australia
Soccer teams on the Gold Coast, Queensland